Sardab Huni (also Romanized as Sardāb Hūnī; also known as Sardāhūnī-ye Vīznah and Sardūnī) is a village in Chubar Rural District, Haviq District, Talesh County, Gilan Province, Iran. At the 2006 census, its population was 38, in 12 families.

References 

Populated places in Talesh County